Lavos is a video game character.

Lavos may also refer to:
Lavos (Figueira da Foz), a parish in Portugal

See also
Lavo (disambiguation)